Helen Woods may refer to:

Anna Kavan, British novelist
Helen Jones Woods, jazz musician

See also
Helen Wood (disambiguation)